Jakub Rzeźniczak (born 26 October 1986 in Łódź) is a Polish professional footballer who plays as a defender for Wisła Płock. Besides Poland, he has played in Azerbaijan.

Career

Club
Earlier in his career he played as a centre-back. During his first couple of seasons at Legia he struggled with consistency, and was eventually loaned out to Widzew Łódź where he spent the 2006–07 season. He returned to Legia the next season and eventually became a regular starter.

On 6 July 2017, Rzeźniczak signed a two-year contract with Qarabağ FK. Rzeźniczak was released by Qarabağ at the end of his contract.

Ahead of the 2019/20 season, Rzeźniczak returned to Poland and signed a 1-year contract with Wisła Płock.

International
Rzeźniczak was formerly a regular member of the Polish U-21 team. He has also played in three friendlies for the senior Poland national football team.

Career statistics

Club

1 All appearances in Ekstraklasa Cup.
2 1 appearance in Polish SuperCup and 5 appearances in Ekstraklasa Cup.
3 All appearances in Polish SuperCup.

Honours
Legia Warsaw
 Ekstraklasa: 2005–06, 2012–13, 2013–14, 2015–16, 2016–17
 Polish Cup: 2007–08, 2010–11, 2011–12, 2012–13, 2014–15, 2015–16
 Polish Super Cup: 2008

Qarabağ
 Azerbaijan Premier League (2): 2017–18, 2018–19

References

External links
 
 
 

1986 births
Living people
Polish footballers
Poland international footballers
Poland under-21 international footballers
Widzew Łódź players
Legia Warsaw players
Qarabağ FK players
Wisła Płock players
Ekstraklasa players
Azerbaijan Premier League players
Expatriate footballers in Azerbaijan
Polish expatriate sportspeople in Azerbaijan
Association football defenders
Footballers from Łódź